Azusa High School is a public high school in Azusa, California, United States, a city east of Los Angeles and east of the San Gabriel Valley. It is one of the three high schools in the Azusa Unified School District.
In addition to offering multiple Advanced Placement courses. Azusa High School is currently an IB (International Baccalaureate) school. Alumni of the school have graduated from prestigious undergraduate institutions like Yale University, Stanford University, Amherst College, University of California, Berkeley, University of Southern California, University of California, Los Angeles, University of California, San Diego etc.

Academics
As of 2022, Azusa High School operates on an 8:00 a.m. to 3:20 p.m. schedule. The only exception is on Wednesday where school ends at 2:30 as every Wednesday is a minimum day.

Enrollment
Azusa High School has had an enrollment of about 1,416 students in 2011–2012 school year. Azusa High School is integrated in the school years of 2011–2012 with, 0.2% American Indian/Alaska Native, 1.1% Asian, 0.3% Native Hawaiian/Pacific Islander, 1.7% Filipino, 90.6% Hispanic, 1.0% Black, and 4.4% White.

Athletics
Currently, Azusa High School offers its students 13 sport teams. All Sports Teams are associated with the Montview League. These sports include:
 Baseball
 Softball
 Basketball
 Golf
 Football
 Wrestling
 Volleyball
 Track & Field
 Soccer
 Cross Country
 Tennis
 Badminton
 Swim.

Aztec Band and Pageantry Corps

The Azusa High School Aztec Band & Pageantry Corps is under the direction of Band Director Douglas McKenna. The Aztec Band is associated with the Southern California School Band and Orchestra Association (SCSBOA).

Marching Band Championship Awards
 2009
  1st Place Gold Medalists 
  2A Division 
  Field Show – Rhythms Of A City
 2010
  2nd Place Silver Medalists
  3A Division
  Field Show –  Attraction!! The Music of Scheherazade
 2011
  1st Place Gold Medalists
  3A Division
  Field Show – Ascension
 2012
  1st Place Gold Medalists
  3A Division
  Field Show – Arachnid
 2013
  5th Place
  3A Division
  Field Show – Regenesis
 2014
  4th Place
  3A Division
  Field Show – The Nightmare
 2015
  5th Place
  3A Division
  Field Show – Wishing You Were Here

The Aztec Band is a combination of marching band, symphonic band, wind ensemble, and jazz band. Pageantry is a competitive Dance and Tall Flag unit with Marching band. Pageantry also has their own season often known as winter guard. The Winterguard team is associated with the Winter Guard Association of Southern California (WGASC).

Winterguard Championship Awards
 2013
  3rd Place Bronze Medalists
  Division RAAA
  Show – Cleopatra
 2014
  3rd Place Bronze Medalists
  Division RAAA
  Show – Abracadabra
 2015
  1st Place Gold Medalists
  Division RAAA
  Show – Bats

Notable people associated with this school
Lizette Salas – professional golfer currently playing on the United States-based LPGA Tour. 
Ruth Wysocki – middle distance runner who specialized in the 800 metres and 1500 metres.
Steve Monreal – professional drummer who performed with the popular American Band, "Tower of Power".

References

External links

Azusa Unified School District

Public high schools in California
High schools in Los Angeles County, California
Azusa, California
1956 establishments in California